Spain competed at the 2012 European Athletics Championships in Helsinki, Finland, from 27 Juneto 1 July.

Medals

Results

Men
Track & road events

Field events

Women
Track & road events

Field events

Athletics Championships
2006 European Athletics Championships
Nations at the 2012 European Athletics Championships